Rasulabad may refer to:
 Rasulabad-e Olya, Hamadan Province
 Rasulabad-e Sofla, Hamadan Province
 Rasulabad, Isfahan
 Rasulabad, Kerman
 Rasulabad, Markazi
 Rasulabad, Irandegan. Khash County, Sistan and Baluchestan Province
 Rasulabad, West Azerbaijan
 Rasulabad, Yazd